The following is a list of the most populous cities in Karnataka state of India as per the 2011 census. There are 26 
cities in Karnataka which have a population over 100,000.

List of cities

See also 
List of districts of Karnataka
List of urban agglomerations in Karnataka
List of most populous metropolitan areas in India
List of most populous cities in India
List of states and union territories of India by population
Demographics of India

References 

Karnataka
Population
Karnataka-related lists
Lists of populated places in Karnataka